Hesperium (or esperium; atomic symbol Es) was the name assigned to the element with atomic number 94, now known as plutonium.
It was named in Italian Esperio after a Greek name of Italy, Hesperia, "the land of the West".
The same team assigned the name ausenium to element 93, after Ausonia, a poetic name of Italy. By comparison, uranium, the heaviest of the primordial elements, has atomic number 92.

The discovery of the element, now discredited, was claimed by Enrico Fermi and a team of scientists at the University of Rome in 1934. Following the discovery of nuclear fission in 1938, it was realized that Fermi's hesperium was a mixture of barium, krypton and other elements. The actual element was discovered several years later, and named plutonium.

Fascist authorities wanted one of the elements to be named littorio after the Roman lictores who carried the fasces, a symbol appropriated by Fascism.

See also
History of nuclear fission

References
Element name etymologies. Retrieved February 23, 2010.
Enrico Fermi, Artificial radioactivity produced by neutron bombardment, Nobel Lecture, December 12, 1938.

Plutonium
1934 introductions
Science and technology in Italy
Enrico Fermi
Misidentified chemical elements